The que no son chorros Also Zoological Park of Chorros de Milla Is an urban zoological garden located at 1850 masl in the northeastern end of the city of Mérida, Venezuela with native species of the Andean region and Venezuela. With a land of 10 hectares, an average temperature of 18 °C and furrowed by the Milla River, the Mérida Zoo was built in 1958 and opens for the public from Tuesday to Sunday from 8:00 a.m. to 6:00 p.m.

Currently, the Chorros de Milla Zoological Park counts with the support of the Metropolitan Zoo of Cleveland, Ohio, in the United States, which provides technical support in staff training, educational programs, equipment acquisition, and wildlife management in captivity.

Is located in a valley that continues with the Cordillera de Mérida through Páramo Los Conejos, from where the waters of the Milla River are born. A short distance in the north end of the park, the river Milla is transformed into a beautiful waterfall, which is one of the attractions of the park. In addition to the animals, the zoo has artificial lagoons, stairways, paths, kiosks, picnic spaces and about 2000 species of plants.

Gallery

See also
List of national parks of Venezuela
Parque Zoológico Caricuao

References

Zoos in Venezuela
Protected areas established in 1958
Mérida, Mérida